Anauayan Island is a small island in northeastern Iloilo, Philippines. It is part of the municipality of Concepcion.

Location and geography 

Anauayan Island is southeast of Panay Island in the Visayan Sea.

See also 

 List of islands in the Philippines

References 

Islands of Iloilo